Apollo Carreon Quiboloy (born April 25, 1950) is a Filipino pastor and church leader of the Philippines-based Restorationist church called the Kingdom of Jesus Christ (KJC). Previously a member of the United Pentecostal Church, he founded the KJC in 1985, and has made claims that he is "the Appointed Son of God" as well as being "the Owner of the Universe".

In November 2021, prosecutors in  California announced sex trafficking charges against Quiboloy, alleging that he and several others had sexually abused female church members aged 12 to 25 in exchange for privileges as well as avoiding "eternal damnation". Many of Quiboloy's assets have been described as ill-gotten. On December 10, 2022, the US Department of Treasury and Department of State imposed sanctions on Quiboloy alongside several other individuals in connection with corruption and gross human rights abuses.

Early life
Quiboloy was born on April 25, 1950, in Buhangin, Davao City, specifically in the area of Dumanlas, and is the youngest of nine children of Pampangans José Quiboloy y Turla and María Carreón y Quinto (born December 28, 1913). Both his parents were natives of Lubao, Pampanga, and had migrated to Davao City following the end of the Second World War to find better opportunities. Quiboloy spent his formative years in Pampanga before moving back to Davao.

Quiboloy was a member of the United Pentecostal Church, a Oneness Pentecostal denomination, until he established the Kingdom of Jesus Christ church. Quiboloy's father, José, was already a Protestant (a member of the Christian and Missionary Alliance) but converted to Oneness Pentecostalism with his four sons. They all became preachers and leaders in the United Pentecostal Church of the Philippines (UPCP), the largest Filipino Oneness Pentecostal Church, which is affiliated to the US-based United Pentecostal Church International. Apollo became president of the powerful UPCP youth organization in 1974, but was expelled from UPCP in 1979 for unorthodox teachings. He came back and was accepted back into the fold in 1980 as pastor of the Agdao Church in Davao City, one of the historical UPCP churches. In 1985, Apollo was put again under investigation by UPCP for his arrogant attitude towards other pastors. Rather than submitting to trial, he left UPCP with some 15 followers on September 1, 1985, and started his own denomination, later known as the Kingdom of Jesus Christ.

Quiboloy studied in a Bible college in Manila where he graduated from in 1972. He also attended a conference in South Korea mostly attended by American and Canadian evangelists the following year.

Church

Kingdom of Jesus Christ

Quiboloy is the founding leader and Executive Pastor of the Kingdom of Jesus Christ, The Name Above Every Name founded on September 1, 1985. He began preaching in the slums of Villamor, Agdao, Davao City with only 15 members. He has received critical responses to his claims of being the "Appointed Son of God".

The sect's main cathedral is located along Buhangin National Highway in Davao City.

His followers refer to their community as a "Kingdom Nation." They claim about 2 million "Kingdom citizens" abroad and 4 million in the Philippines. On weekdays, members hold bible sessions and prayer services. On Sundays, a "Global Worship" is held at the Cathedral in Buhangin District. In 2000, Quiboloy founded José María College, named after his parents.

The church under Quiboloy's leadership would establish the Sonshine Media Network International (President and CEO), and 17 radio stations in the Philippines. It also has two newspapers, Pinas and Sikat. The church also has Sonshine Sports Management, a sports management group established in 2014.

Divinity claims
Quiboloy has claimed possession of divine powers, including stopping the 2019 Cotabato earthquakes at his command, and has said that the public should thank him for the act. He has publicly said that he did not do the same to stop the onslaught of Typhoon Kammuri (Tisoy) in response to those critical of his earlier claim in stopping the Cotabato earthquakes.

During the COVID-19 pandemic, following his indictment by the United States Federal Bureau of Investigation in November 2021, Quibolloy said that the emergence of the Omicron covid-19 variant is due to the "persecuting, prosecuting and maligning" he received from the public.

Political involvement

Quiboloy anointed Gilbert Teodoro as the next president in the 2010 Philippine presidential election. Teodoro finished fourth in the election with 4,095,839 votes (or 11.33%). He remarked that he was disturbed by reports of fraud and cheating and wondered to whom did votes from his church go.

In the 2016 national elections, Quiboloy and the members of the Kingdom of Jesus Christ endorsed the presidential candidacy of the pastor's close friend, Davao City mayor Rodrigo Duterte and his running mate Senator Alan Peter Cayetano. Quiboloy also lent his private jet and helicopter to be used in Duterte's presidential campaign. Quiboloy also served as Duterte's spiritual adviser during his presidency.

In the 2022 national elections, Quiboloy endorsed the candidacy of Bongbong Marcos who was running for president. He supported his vice presidential candidate, Sara Duterte as well. Quiboloy's parents' loyal support for former President Ferdinand Marcos was a factor for the endorsement. Quiboloy is also good friends with the Marcos family in general.

Controversies

Allegations of brainwashing by a former church member
Quiboloy and the Kingdom of Jesus Christ have been sued by a woman for allegedly brainwashing and holding her 19-year-old daughter, who joined the church in 2004, against her will.

Dispute with the New People's Army

The New People's Army (NPA), the armed wing of the Communist Party of the Philippines, has accused Quiboloy of being behind the massacre of K'lata-Bagobo leader Datu Domingo Diarog and his family on April 29, 2008, for allegedly refusing to sell  of their property for ₱50,000 to Quiboloy and his sect.

The property is within the  ancestral domain claimed by the Bagobo people in Tugbok and is adjacent to Quiboloy's walled "prayer mountain" in Tamayong.

Diarog's widow said followers of Quiboloy had threatened to evict them from the land and her relatives were even offered a ₱20,000 bounty for Diarog's head.

Quiboloy, however, said the charges were "totally false and baseless, if not ridiculous."

While Quiboloy has branded the rebels "mga anak ni Satanas" ("Satan's offspring"), the NPA has declared him a "warlord in the service of the Arroyo administration's policies against the peasants and indigenous peoples."

Police investigator Ireneo Dalogdog, head of the Tugbok police office, said he had been receiving reports that Diarog was being harassed by armed men associated with Quiboloy, and that Diarog's farmhouse had earlier been razed three times.

2020 ABS-CBN shutdown

In November 2019, Vice Ganda on It's Showtime! satirized Quiboloy's claims of stopping the series of earthquakes in Mindanao by exclaiming, "Stop!". Ganda jokingly challenged Quiboloy to also stop the country's longest running television series Ang Probinsyano, which had been airing on ABS-CBN for at least five years at that point. Quiboloy accepted the challenge and declared that in four months, the whole network's operations would shut down as well. On May 5, 2020, the National Telecommunications Commission ordered ABS-CBN to cease its television and radio broadcasting operations after their 25-year broadcast franchise expired the previous day. The station then officially signed off at 7:52 pm local time the same day. More than two months later, on July 10, 2020, the House of Representatives of the Philippines rejected the new ABS-CBN franchise bid after a 70-11 vote against it. Following this, ABS-CBN shifted its news, radio, and entertainment operations into online platforms and other television networks. Ang Probinsyano released its series finale on August 12, 2022.

Rape and sex trafficking accusations, indictments, sanctions
Prosecutors on behalf of the United States Department of Justice indicted Quiboloy and other church members on charges of sex trafficking on November 11, 2021. The indictment charged him with allegedly coercing girls and young women to have sex with him, as well as running a sex trafficking operation that threatened victims. Among the claimed victims are children as young as twelve. According to the indictment, Quiboloy allegedly threatened them with "eternal damnation" and physical abuse, through the fraudulent California charity "Children's Joy". According to the US Department of Justice's allegations, underage girls were forced into so-called "night duties", where they were sexually abused by the pastor. Prosecutors have stated that they will also retrieve Quiboloy's US assets originating from ill-gotten wealth, alleging that he used church donations to pay for his lavish lifestyle. On February 5, 2022, the Federal Bureau of Investigation released a wanted poster for Quiboloy.

As of August 2022, the Philippine Department of Foreign Affairs is still yet to receive an extradition request from the US Department of Justice. Once found to be sufficient, the request can then be endorsed to the Philippine Department of Justice.

On December 10, 2022, the US Department of Treasury and Department of State imposed sanctions on Quiboloy for gross human rights abuses and corruption. These sanctions come on the occasion of International Anti-Corruption Day and on the eve of International Human Rights Day, wherein the United States sanctioned up to forty individuals and entities from nine different countries for corruption and human rights violations.  The sanctions were imposed based by Executive Order 13818 pursuant to the US Global Magnitsky Act. Quiboloy is accused of being involved in the sexual abuse and human trafficking of young girls within his religious group. 

The US imposed the following sanctions on Quiboloy. 

 All properties and interests that are in the US or in possession of US persons are blocked and must be referred to the US’ treasury department.
 Any entities directly or indirectly owned, 50% or more are blocked.
 All transactions of US persons or within/transiting in the US that involve any of Quiboloy’s property or interests in property are prohibited, unless authorized.
 Making or receipt of any contribution or provision of funds, goods, or services by, to, or for Quiboloy’s benefit are also prohibited.

Complaints filed by Quiboloy and KJC members

Reports on Quiboloy and complaints against Rappler, et al
In December 2021, Rappler published series of articles detailing accusations against Quiboloy including sexual abuse, trafficking and fraud. In connection with these, since January 2022, Kingdom of Jesus Christ officials filed a total of 53 counts of cyber libel against Rappler and its four journalists, and four resource persons including an Ateneo de Manila University professor and three former KJC members who turned as whistleblowers, ​before the City Prosecutor's offices in various cities in Mindanao, particularly in Cagayan de Oro (7 counts), Davao City (28), General Santos (7), Ozamiz (7) and Panabo (4); all were dismissed for lack of probable cause with those filed in Davao City the last to be dismissed in May.

Complaint against Manny Pacquiao
Then senator and presidential candidate Manny Pacquiao cited charges of sexual abuse against Quiboloy as his reason for turning down an invitation for a presidential debate that was organized by the latter in February 2022. This was the subject of a cyber libel complaint filed by Quiboloy against Pacquiao, which was dismissed by Davao City prosecutors in September, stating the complainant's failure to present supporting evidence.

Notes

References

External links
 

1950 births
Living people
People from Davao City
Kapampangan people
Filipino Protestants
Filipino anti-communists
Filipino Christian religious leaders
Filipino television evangelists
Self-declared messiahs
21st-century Filipino businesspeople
Founders of new religious movements
Fugitives wanted by the United States
Fugitives wanted on sex crime charges
Fugitives wanted on fraud charges
Religious controversies in the Philippines
Child sexual abuse scandals in Christianity